The Embassy of Mexico in Spain, based out of Madrid, is the primary diplomatic mission from the United Mexican States to the Kingdom of Spain. Diplomatic relations between the two countries were established in 1836, 15 years after the  Mexican War of Independence, but were severed in 1940 due to Mexico's support for the Second Spanish Republic in the Spanish Civil War. Relations were re-established in 1977 when Spain returned to a democracy following the death of Francisco Franco.

The head of the mission also represents Mexico before the World Tourism Organization.

Location 
The chancery building of the Embassy, as well as the Consular Section, is located at 46 Carrera de San Jerónimo in the Cortes Ward of the Centro District.

Mexico also maintains a consulate in Barcelona. It is located at Paseo de la Bonanova, 55.

Ambassadors 
The Ambassador of Mexico to the Spain is the highest ranking diplomatic representative of the United Mexican States to the Kingdom of Spain and subsequently holds the rank of "Ambassador Extraordinary and Plenipotentiary." The following is a list of Mexican ambassadors since the presidency of Felipe Calderón:

 Under President Felipe Calderón Hinojosa (2006 – 2012) 
 2006 – 2007: Enrique Gabriel Jiménez Remus	
 2007 – 2011: Jorge Zermeño Infante
 Under President Enrique Peña Nieto (2012 – 2018) 
 2012 – 2013: Francisco Javier Ramírez Acuña
 2013 – 2018: Roberta Lajous Vargas
 Under President Andrés Manuel López Obrador (2018 – Present) 
 2018 – 2022: Roberta Lajous Vargas
 2022 – Present: Quirino Ordaz Coppel

Embassy sections 
The Embassy exercises a number of functions in its representation to the Government of the Spain, including political, administrative, economic, public diplomacy, and consular affairs, that are managed by officials from the Secretariat of Foreign Affairs. Some of the different sections of the Embassy are as follow:

 Office of the Ambassador
 Office of the chief of the chancellery
 Office of the consular section
 Office for cooperation with the Ibero-American Summit
 Office for internal policy and cooperation
 Office for press and media
 Office for foreign policy and multilateral affairs
 Office for community affairs
 Office of the director of the Mexican Cultural Institute

Honorary consulates 

In addition to the Consular Section in Madrid and the Consulate in Barcelona, the Embassy also maintains honorary consulates throughout Spain. They are located in the following cities:

 Gijón
 Attends: Asturias and Province of León
 Murcia
 Attends: Murcia and Province of Albacete
 Palma de Mallorca
 Attends: Balearic Islands
 Santa Cruz de Tenerife
 Attends: Canary Islands
 Seville
 Attends: Andalusia
 Valencia
 Attends: Province of Castellón and Province of Valencia
 Zaragoza
 Attends: Aragon

See also 
 Mexico–Spain relations
 Foreign relations of Mexico
 List of diplomatic missions of Mexico

References

External links 
 Official website (in Spanish)
 Secretariat of Foreign Affairs (in Spanish)

Paris
Mexico
Mexican Embassy